Maureen Paley (born 1953) is the American owner of a contemporary art gallery in Bethnal Green, London, where she lives. It was founded in 1984, called Interim Art during the 1990s, and renamed Maureen Paley in 2004. She exhibited Young British Artists at an early stage. Artists represented include Turner Prize winners Lawrence Abu Hamdan, Gillian Wearing and Wolfgang Tillmans. One thing in common with many of the artists represented is their interest in addressing social issues.

The gallery is located at 60 Three Colts Lane. Maureen Paley opened a space in Hove called Morena di Luna in 2017  and in 2021 opened Studio M at Rochelle School in Shoreditch.

Early life

Maureen Paley was born in New York. She attended Sarah Lawrence College, and graduated from Brown University in 1975. She emigrated to England in 1977, attending the Royal College of Art from 1978–1980, where she gained an MA in photography.

1980s

In 1984, Paley began a gallery programme in her Victorian terraced house. During the late 1980s, she exhibited examples of contemporary art by Tim Rollins and K.O.S., Sarah Charlesworth, Charles Ray, Mike Kelley, Michelangelo Pistoletto and Günther Förg.

1990s

In the early 1990s, the gallery presented several exhibitions made by the burgeoning group of artists that were to become known as the YBAs—including, Henry Bond, Angela Bulloch and Liam Gillick. For years she developed the careers of Gillian Wearing and Wolfgang Tillmans. 

She was called by Time Out "a true pioneer of the East End", having presented work there before it was fashionable. For almost a decade, the gallery was supported by Arts Council grants and other patronage.

In September 1999, the gallery moved to Herald Street in Bethnal Green, occupying "a chic new industrial space." Paley's base in the area was a precedent for leading galleries such as White Cube and Victoria Miro to also locate in the East End."

Curated exhibitions
In 1994, Paley curated a show at Camden Arts Centre of work by Joseph Kosuth, Ad Reinhardt and Félix González-Torres. In 1995, she presented Wall to Wall featuring wall drawings by artists including Daniel Buren, Michael Craig-Martin, Douglas Gordon, Barbara Kruger, Sol LeWitt, and Lawrence Weiner. The National Touring Exhibitions show went to the Serpentine Gallery, London, Southampton City Art Gallery, and Leeds City Art Gallery. In 1996, for the Henry Moore Sculpture Trust, Paley curated The Cauldron, an exhibition of work by Young British Artists—Christine Borland, Angela Bulloch, Jake and Dinos Chapman, Steven Pippin, Georgina Starr and Gillian Wearing. It was installed in the Trust's studio space in Dean Clough, Halifax.

2000s
In 2000, Paley staged The Agony and the Ecstasy, the first show of Rebecca Warren, who she met after Paley had given a talk at her art school.

She said in 2001, "Being a tastemaker—someone who invents the future—requires a delicate balance. You need to be of your time—if you're too far ahead you'll be misunderstood."

In 2004, the gallery's name was changed from Interim Art to Maureen Paley. In 2006, when asked why many women have been successful in contemporary art dealing, Paley said,

Art is one of the last unregulated markets. There are no male gatekeepers and you are not confined to traditional alpha-male values. That makes it very attractive to a certain type of woman with a strong personality, who wouldn't fit into a cookie-cutter working environment [...].

Paley was one of the judges of New Sensations, a competition for art students promoted by Channel 4 and the Saatchi Gallery. Jo Craven said in The Daily Telegraph that Paley was one of only five female gallery owners of note in London. The Evening Standard included her in London's 50 most influential people in art and design in 2008 and 2009.

In 2009, she was placed at 87 (from 70 the previous year) in ArtReview's art world Power 100 list. The citation drew attention to the presence of gallery artists at major events, such as Rebecca Warren at the Serpentine Gallery and Wolfgang Tillmans at the Venice Biennale.

In August 2009, reflecting on the legacy of the YBA art scene, Paley said, "The thing that came out of the YBA generation was boldness, a belief that you can do anything."

In 2009, Paley was elected to the Executive Committee of the Society of London Art Dealers.

2010s-
In 2010, Paley was one of a group of art dealers including Sadie Coles who made up the selection committee for the Frieze Art Fair.

She supports the programmes of Artists Space, Creative Industries Federation, Open School East, Serpentine Gallery, The Showroom, Studio Voltaire, and White Columns. Paley is also a patron of Camden Arts Centre, Chisenhale Gallery, ICA, London, Michael Clark Company, South London Gallery, Tate, Artangel, the Whitechapel Gallery, Charleston, Peer, and Pallant House Galley, as well as a supporter of the Gallery Climate Coalition (GCC). The gallery also takes part in Condo, an exhibition series where host galleries collaborate and share their spaces with visiting galleries.

In 2020, Paley was interviewed for the Art Agency, Partners podcast In Other Words. In 2022, the gallery was listed as one of the '15 best art galleries in London.'

Artists

References

External links

American art dealers
Women art dealers
Businesspeople from New York City
Pembroke College in Brown University alumni
Living people
1953 births
American expatriates in the United Kingdom
Sarah Lawrence College alumni
Art dealers from London